David Dockendorf (November 2, 1923 – April 15, 1997) was an American sound engineer. He was nominated for an Academy Award in the category Sound Recording for the film Butch Cassidy and the Sundance Kid. He worked on 100 films between 1958 and 1990.

Selected filmography
 Butch Cassidy and the Sundance Kid (1969)

References

External links

1923 births
1997 deaths
20th-century American engineers
American audio engineers
Best Sound BAFTA Award winners
People from Wisconsin